Raivo Palmaru (born 27 November 1951 in Pärnu) is an Estonian social scientist, journalist, sports figure and politician.

From 2005 to 2007, he was Minister of Culture.

References

Living people
1951 births
Estonian social scientists
Estonian journalists
Estonian Centre Party politicians
Ministers of Culture of Estonia
University of Tartu alumni
Politicians from Pärnu